Lansac is the name of several communes in France:

 Lansac, in the Gironde department
 Lansac, in the Hautes-Pyrénées department
 Lansac, in the Pyrénées-Orientales department
 Lansac, a hamlet part of the commune of Tarascon, in the Bouches-du-Rhône department